The Roman Catholic Apostolic Prefecture of Xinjiang is a pre-diocesan missionary jurisdiction (apostolic prefecture) located in the city of Yuncheng in Shanxi, China.

History
On May 25, 1936, the Roman Catholic Diocese of Xinjiang (Jiangzhou) was established by a decree of Pope Pius XI.

Leadership
 Quintinus Pessers OFM (1936-1983), expelled from the Communist China in 1954, did not have real power after that time in the diocese.
 Bishop Augustine Zheng Shouduo (1982/3-2006)
 Bishop Josaphat Li Hongguang (2006)
 Bishop Peter Wu Junwei (2009–2022)

References

External links
 Giga-Catholic Information
 Catholic-Hierarchy
 Catholic Hierarchy in China since 1307
 Bulla Ad Christi Evangelium, AAS 28

Xinjiang